863 Benkoela  is an A-type asteroid orbiting the Sun that was discovered by German astronomer Max Wolf on 9 February 1917 from Heidelberg.

10μ radiometric data collected from Kitt Peak in 1975 gave a diameter estimate of 34 km.

References

External links 
 Lightcurve plot of 863 Benkoela, Palmer Divide Observatory, B. D. Warner (2004)
 Asteroid Lightcurve Database (LCDB), query form (info )
 Dictionary of Minor Planet Names, Google books
 Asteroids and comets rotation curves, CdR – Observatoire de Genève, Raoul Behrend
 Discovery Circumstances: Numbered Minor Planets (1)-(5000) – Minor Planet Center
 
 

000863
Discoveries by Max Wolf
Named minor planets
000863
000863
19170209